Aleksandra Uścińska (born December 2, 1984) is a Polish taekwondo practitioner, who competed in the women's featherweight category. She picked up a total of thirteen medals in her taekwondo career, including a silver from the World Junior Championships in Killarney, Ireland, and represented her nation Poland at the 2004 Summer Olympics. Uscinska also trained as a member of the taekwondo squad for Rapid Srem Sports Club in her native Poznań, under head coach and master Robert Sadurski.

Uscinska qualified as a lone taekwondo fighter for the Polish squad in the women's featherweight class (57 kg) at the 2004 Summer Olympics in Athens, by placing third and granting a berth from the European Olympic Qualifying Tournament in Baku, Azerbaijan. Having a lack of international experience to the sport, Uscinska endured her first-round defeat 2–11 to Spain's Sonia Reyes. With her Spanish opponent narrowly losing the quarterfinals to South Korea's Jang Ji-won, Uscinska withered her hopes to compete for the Olympic bronze medal through the repechage.

References

External links

1984 births
Living people
Polish female taekwondo practitioners
Olympic taekwondo practitioners of Poland
Taekwondo practitioners at the 2004 Summer Olympics
Sportspeople from Poznań
21st-century Polish women